The Politburo, a 49-member body, formulates and decides policy for the Zimbabwe African National Union – Patriotic Front,  a governing party in the Zimbabwean Parliament. Robert Mugabe, the former President of both the country and the party, appointed most of the members of the Politburo.

Membership as of 14 February 2010 
Politburo Z A N U - P F, 14 February 2010

BHASIKITI, Kudakwashe, Deputy Secretary, Dept of Economic Affairs,  DOB:  06 Feb 1962 Nat ID no: 54-016702F54

BUKA, Flora, Committee Member,  DOB:  25 Feb 1968

CHAKANYUKA, Edison, Deputy Secretary, Dept of Youth Affairs,

CHIMBUDZI, Alice, Committee Member,  DOB:  5 May 1954 Nat ID no: 45-025625W45

CHINAMASA, Patrick Anthony, Deputy Secretary, Dept of Legal Affairs,  DOB:  25 Jan 1947 Nat ID no: 63-005591M42

CHITEPO, Victoria Fikile, Committee Member,  DOB:  27 Mar 1928

CHIZEMA, Cleveria, Committee Member,  DOB:  23 Mar 1946 Nat ID no: 63-179352H32

CHOMBO, Ignatius Morgen Chiminya, Secretary, Dept of Land Reform & Resettlement,  DOB:  01 Aug 1952 Nat ID no: 70- 086938D 70

DAMASANE, Sipambekile Abigail, Secretary, Dept of Gender & Culture,  DOB:  27 May 1952 Nat ID no: 08-247958W21

DOKORA, Lazarus Dagwa Kambamarami, Deputy Secretary, Dept of Education,  DOB:  03 Nov 1957 Nat ID no: 22-047107W61

DUBE, Tshinga Judge, Committee Member,  DOB:  03 Jul 1941 Nat ID no: 63-260026X39

GOCHE, Nicholas Tasungurwa, Secretary, Dept of Transport & Welfare,  DOB:  01 Aug 1946 Nat ID no: 63-355978S68

GUMBO, Rugare Aleck Ngidi, Secretary, Dept of Information & Publicity,  DOB:  08 Feb 1940 Nat ID no: 63-263682W03

GUMPO, James, Deputy Secretary, Dept of Business Development & Liaison,

HUNGWE, Josaya Dunira, Committee Member,  DOB:  07 Nov 1935 Nat ID no: 63-435251J12

KANGAI, Kumbirai Manyika, Committee Member,  DOB:  17 Feb 1938 Nat ID no: 63-696211L07

KARIMANZIRA, David Ishemunyoro Godi, Secretary, Dept of Finance,  DOB:  23 May 1947 Nat ID no: 63-327605C47

KASUKUWERE, Saviour, Secretary, Dept of Indigenisation & Economic Empowerment,  DOB:  23 Oct 1970 Nat ID no: 45-046113Q45

KHAYA MOYO, Simon, Member, Dept of The Presidium,  DOB:  01 Oct 1945 Nat ID no: 63-735452P56

MADZONGWE, Edna, Committee Member,  DOB:  11 Jul 1945 Nat ID no: 63-748119H32

MALINGA, Joshua Teke, Deputy Secretary, Dept of Disabled & Disadvantaged Persons,  DOB:  28 Apr 1944 Nat ID no: 08-165505Y21

MALULEKE, O, Committee Member,

MASAWI, Ephraim Sango, Deputy Secretary, Dept of Commissariat,

MASUKU, Angelinah, Committee Member,  DOB:  14 Oct 1936 Nat ID no: 08-266228E19

MATHEMA, Ndabazekhaya Cain Ginyilitshe, Deputy Secretary, Dept of Information & Publicity,  DOB:  28 Jan 1949 Nat ID no: 63-683168J73

MATHUTHU, Sithokozile, Committee Member,  DOB:  20 Jun 1968 Nat ID no: 21-024916T21

MAVHAIRE, Dzikamai Callisto, Secretary, Dept of Production & Labour,  DOB:  07 Mar 1951 Nat ID no: 63-358200H22

MAWEMA, Nelson Takawira, Deputy Secretary, Dept of Environment & Tourism,  DOB:  15 May 1937 Nat ID no: 63-358134L27

MNANGAGWA, Emmerson Dambudzo, Secretary, Dept of Legal Affairs,  DOB:  15 Sep 1946 Nat ID no: 63-450183P67

MOMBESHORA, Douglas T, Deputy Secretary, Dept of Health & Child Welfare,  DOB:  06 Jan 1961

MPOFU, Obert Moses, Secretary, Dept of Economic Affairs,  DOB:  12 Oct 1951 Nat ID no: 08-186074F79

MSIPA, Cephas George, Committee Member,  DOB:  07 Jul 1931 Nat ID no: 63-358147A67

MUCHENA, Olivia Nyembezi, Secretary, Dept of Science & Technology,  DOB:  18 Aug 1946 Nat ID no: 63-337191X50

MUCHINGURI, Oppah Charm Zvipange, Secretary, Dept of Women's Affairs,  DOB:  14 Dec 1958 Nat ID no: 63-741411R50

MUDENDA, Jacob, Committee Member,

MUDENGE, Stanislaus Isack Gorerazvo, Secretary, Dept of External Relations,  DOB:  17 Dec 1941 Nat ID no: 63-645385Q22

MUGABE, Robert Gabriel, First Secretary, Dept of The Presidium,  DOB:  21 Feb 1924 Nat ID no: 63- 693939R70

MUGANDE, Samuel, Deputy Secretary, Dept of Transport & Welfare,

MUJURU, Joice Teurai, Second Secretary, Dept of The Presidium,  DOB:  15 Apr 1955 Nat ID no: 63-445325J18

MUJURU, Solomon Tapfumaneyi Ruzambo, Committee Member,  DOB:  1 May 1949

MUKUSHA, Stefano, Deputy Secretary, Dept of Gender & Culture,

MURERWA, Herbert Muchemwa, Deputy Secretary, Dept of Land & Resettlement,  DOB:  31 Jul 1941 Nat ID no: 25- 021670R 25

MUTASA, Didymus Noel Edwin, Secretary, Dept of Administration,  DOB:  27 Jul 1935 Nat ID no: 63-358184Q42

MUTEZO, Munacho Thomas Alvar, Committee Member,  DOB:  14 Feb 1954 Nat ID no: 29-129727W44

MUZENDA, Tsitsi Veronica, Committee Member,  DOB:  22 Aug 1922

NCUBE, Edson, Deputy Secretary, Dept of Administration,

NCUBE, Abednico, Deputy Secretary, Dept of External Relations,  DOB:  13 Mar 1954 Nat ID no: 28-011436M28

NDLOVU, Richard, Deputy Secretary, Dept of Production & Labour,  DOB:  26 Jun 1942

NDLOVU, Naison Khutshwekhaya, Committee Member,  DOB:  22 Oct 1930 Nat ID no: 08-213829Z21

NHEMA, Francis Chenayimoyo Dunstan, Secretary, Dept of Environment & Tourism,  DOB:  17 Apr 1959 Nat ID no: 63-117843A66

NKOMO, John Landa, Second Secretary, Dept of The Presidium,  DOB:  22 Aug 1934 Nat ID no: 63-358161Q73

NYONI, Sithembiso Gile Glad, Secretary, Dept of Business Development & Liaison,  DOB:  20 Sep 1949 Nat ID no: 08-434871M67

PARIRENYATWA, David Pagwesese, Secretary, Dept of Health & Child Welfare,  DOB:  02 Aug 1950 Nat ID no: 63-320762P47

PATEL, Kantibhai Gordhanbha, Committee Member,  DOB:  28 Oct 1928 Nat ID no: 63-010704V00

SAKUPWANYA, Stanley Urayayi, Secretary, Dept of Welfare Of The Disabled & Disadvantaged Persons,  DOB:  14 May 1939 Nat ID no: 63-435281R50

SANDI MOYO, Eunice Nomthandazo, Deputy Secretary, Dept of Women's Affairs,  DOB:  08 Nov 1946 Nat ID no: 08-443369Z56

SAVANHU, Tendai, Deputy Secretary, Dept of Indigenisation & Economic Empowerment,  DOB:  21 Mar 1968

SEKERAMAYI, Sydney Tigere, Secretary, Dept of National Security,  DOB:  30 Mar 1944 Nat ID no: 63-358166W43

SHAMU, Webster Kotiwani, Secretary, Dept of Commissariat,  DOB:  06 Jun 1945 Nat ID no: 63- 676065N32

SHAMUYARIRA, Nathan Marwirakuwa, Committee Member,  DOB:  28 Sep 1930 Nat ID no: 63-327601Y32

SIKHOSANA, Absolom, Secretary, Dept of Youth Affairs,

TAWENGWA, Charles, Deputy Secretary, Dept of Finance,

ZHUWAO, Patrick, Deputy Secretary, Dept of Science & Technology,  DOB:  23 May 1967 Nat ID no: 63-621736K70

Former members
 Simba Makoni (Politburo Deputy Secretary General for Economic Affairs)
 Zenzo Nsimbi

Politics of Zimbabwe
Political organisations based in Zimbabwe
Politburo
Politburos